The Manchester Unity of Oddfellows (RNLI Official Number 960) was an   lifeboat of the Royal National Lifeboat Institution (RNLI) stationed at  in the English county of Norfolk from 10 July 1961 until 1990 when she was replaced after 29 years service by an  second generation Rigid Inflatable Boat (RIB) in May 1992. During the time that The Manchester Unity of Oddfellows was on station at Sheringham, she performed 127 service launches, rescuing 134 lives.

Design and construction
The Manchester Unity of Oddfellows was built at the yard of William Osborne at Littlehampton, West Sussex. She was an Oakley class self-righting design which combined great stability with the ability to self-right in the event of the lifeboat capsizing. This was achieved by a system of shifting water ballast. The system worked by the lifeboat taking on one and half tons of sea water at launching in to a tank built into the base of the hull. If the lifeboat then reached a crucial point of capsize the ballast water would transfer through valves to a righting tank built into the port side. If the capsize was to the starboard side of the lifeboat, the water shift started when an angle of 165° was reached. This would push the boat into completing a full 360° roll. If the capsize was to the port side, the water transfer started at 110°. In this case the weight of water combined with the weight of machinery aboard the lifeboat usually managed to stop the roll and allow the lifeboat to bounce back to upright.

Hull construction
The hull of The Manchester Unity of Oddfellows was constructed from African mahogany built with two skins. Each skin was diagonally laid with a layer of calico laid between the skins. The outer skin was ⅜ of an inch thick with the inner skin being ¼ of an inch thick. The keel was iron and weighed 1.154 tons. The hull was divided into eleven watertight compartments. The wheelhouse was positioned amidships.

Equipment
The lifeboat was fitted with Decca 060 radar and all she carried Pye Westminster VHF and an Ajax MF radio telephones. In addition a radio Direction Finding set was carried, which gave a magnetic bearing to a transmitting station. The electric searchlight was standard along with Pains Wessex speedlines.

Service and rescues
The Manchester Unity of Oddfellows performed a total of 127 service launches during here 29 years at Sheringham becoming the longest serving Oakley class lifeboat in the RNLI’s fleet.

Coxswains
Over the period that The Manchester Unity of Oddfellows was stationed at Sheringham she had a total of five coxswains who were as follows:
Henry Downtide West, 1961 to 1962
Henry Joyful West, 1963 to 1984
Jack West, 1985 to 1986
Brian Pegg, 1986 to 1989
Clive Rayment, 1989 to 1990

Rescue of the Lucy
One notable rescue was carried out on 15 August 1961. the Lucy was herself a converted ship's lifeboat and she was on her maiden voyage from Peterborough to Southwold. There was a north west wind blowing, bitterly cold and sea conditions were described as short steep sea.
The Lucy sprung a leak at the stern and started to take on water rapidly. Her four crew became concerned and started to send up distress signals. The signals were spotted and The Manchester Unity of Oddfellows  made what was going to be a difficult launched. Because of the conditions of the tide, haul-off rope had to be used to prevent the lifeboat from being washed broadsides onto the beach. Just as the boat left the carriage the mast holding the haul-off rope snapped and it was only by skilful handling by coxwain Henry 'Downtide' West that tragedy was averted. Three lifeboatmen were put aboard the Lucy to help transfer the boat owner's unconscious wife and young son to The Manchester Unity of Oddfellows. The owner was transferred next, while the fourth member of the crew remained on board with the lifeboatmen while a tow was attempted. In the fierce swell the  tow rope snapped and the coxwain decided to evacuate the four men remaining on board. The casualties were landed at Sheringham and all made a full recovery.

Retirement
When The Manchester Unity of Oddfellows was retired from service her place was temporally taken by the last of Sheringham's all-weather lifeboats, the Lloyds II, built in 1966 and paid for by donations from members of Lloyd's of London. On 18 April 1992, Lloyds II left Sheringham having performed seven services while on station. In May 1992 an  second generation Rigid Inflatable Boat (RIB) also named Manchester Unity of Oddfellows became the permanent replacement for The Manchester Unity of Oddfellows ON 960

The lifeboat displayed at Sheringham Museum

Service and rescues

References

Sheringham lifeboats
Manchester
1961 ships
Oakley-class lifeboats
Ships and vessels on the National Register of Historic Vessels